Ryszard Tadeusz Stadniuk (born 27 October 1951) is a Polish rower who competed in the 1976 Summer Olympics and in the 1980 Summer Olympics.

He was born in Szczecin.

In 1976 he was a crew member of the Polish boat which finished sixth in the Coxed pair event.

Four years later he won the bronze medal with the Polish boat in the 1980 coxed fours competition. At the same Olympics he also competed with the Polish team in the 1980 eights contest and finished ninth.

External links
 profile

1951 births
Living people
Polish male rowers
Olympic rowers of Poland
Rowers at the 1976 Summer Olympics
Rowers at the 1980 Summer Olympics
Olympic bronze medalists for Poland
Sportspeople from Szczecin
Olympic medalists in rowing
Medalists at the 1980 Summer Olympics
World Rowing Championships medalists for Poland